Marius Marian Croitoru (born 2 October 1980) is a Romanian professional football manager and former player. He played as a right winger and possessed a powerful shot and good ball technique.

Club career

Croitoru made his professional debut in a second division game for Turistul București. In 2000, he moved to Liga I club FCM Bacău.

After six seasons with FCM Bacău, Croitoru moved to fellow first league club FC Vaslui, where he impressed alongside Viorel Frunză.

In January 2007, after some impressive displays for Vaslui, he was transferred by Steaua București. After only one season, he was loaned to Ceahlăul Piatra Neamț.

Managerial career

FC Botoșani
In the summer of 2019, although still not in possession of a UEFA Pro Licence, Croitoru was appointed as head coach of Liga I club Botoșani. In his third game in charge, he managed a historic 2–0 away win against FCSB.

FC U Craiova
On 23 June 2022, Croitoru was appointed as head coach of Liga I club FC U Craiova, agreeing to a two-year contract. On 10 October 2022, Croitoru was released of duty from FC U Craiova, after losing 0-1 against Chindia Târgoviște on the same day.

FC Argeș Pitești
On 26 October 2022, Croitoru was appointed as head coach of Liga I club Argeș Pitești, agreeing to a one-and-a-half-year contract.

Personal life
His son, David Croitoru is a football player who made his debut in professional football for Botoșani under the guidance of Marius.

Career statistics

Club

Managerial statistics

Honours

Player
Botoșani
Liga II: 2012–13

ACS Poli Timișoara
Cupa Ligii runner-up: 2016–17

References

External links
 
 
 

1980 births
Living people
People from Giurgiu
Romanian footballers
Association football midfielders
FCM Bacău players
FC Vaslui players
FC Steaua București players
FC Steaua II București players
CSM Ceahlăul Piatra Neamț players
FC Politehnica Iași (1945) players
FC Atyrau players
FC Astra Giurgiu players
FC Botoșani players
ACS Poli Timișoara players
Liga I players
Liga II players
Liga III players
Romanian expatriate footballers
Expatriate footballers in Kazakhstan
Romanian expatriate sportspeople in Kazakhstan
Romanian football managers
FC Botoșani managers
FC U Craiova 1948 managers
FC Argeș Pitești managers
Liga I managers